Andraya Yearwood (born 2002) is an American transgender student athlete from Connecticut. Yearwood began competing on a high school girls' team in early April 2017 and won first place in the girls 100- and 200-meter dashes. Yearwood's second-place finish at the Connecticut Interscholastic Athletic Conference (CIAC) 100-yard dash finals on June 4, 2017, behind another transgender student, gained international media attention.

The decision of the State of Connecticut to allow Yearwood to compete on the women's team is a focus of debate surrounding Title IX and trans people. In 2018, writing on the subject of transgender people in sports, ESPN called Yearwood and a handful of other transgender athletes "focal points in a fight over the future of sports". Yearwood has competed without hormones or puberty blockers, which, according to Vice Media, "could have contributed to an advantage". However, Vice Media also stated that schools requiring medical treatment for transgender athletes would create a barrier to entry due to the costs of treatment. In June of 2018, in the state of Connecticut, there was a petition created by parents of student-athletes that had the goal of banning transgender girls from competing in girls' sports. The petition allowed Yearwood to speak on Good Morning America and address the issues that came with the petition and encourage other transgender girls to pursue the path they choose no matter who tries to bring them down.The families of three students who have competed against Yearwood filed a lawsuit in an attempt to bar transgender athletes from competing in women's teams in Connecticut; the families are represented by the conservative nonprofit organization, Alliance Defending Freedom. The lawsuit was dismissed in April 2021 by the district court as moot.

In 2019, Andraya Yearwood appeared in 'Changing The Game' which in a documentary that highlights the stories of three transgender athletes and the hardships they faced in the athletic industry being a transgender person. In the documentary Yearwood talks about her journey of becoming her true authentic self through all of the struggles she faced growing up.

In 2021, the Biden Administration withdrew former Attorney General William Barr’s support of the exclusion of Yearwood, reconsidering her right as a woman and her right to play women's sports.

Yearwood received recruitment interest from Harvard University, the University of Connecticut, Springfield College, and West Point to run track and field in the NCAA. She is currently a student at North Carolina Central University.

References

Further reading

Gender and sport
Living people
Sportspeople from Connecticut
Student athletes
Transgender sportswomen
Transgender women
LGBT track and field athletes
LGBT people from Connecticut
American LGBT sportspeople
2002 births
21st-century LGBT people